Levínská Olešnice is a municipality and village in Semily District in the Liberec Region of the Czech Republic. It has about 300 inhabitants.

Administrative parts
The village of Žďár is an administrative part of Levínská Olešnice.

Notable people
Ladislav Zívr (1909–1980), sculptor; died here

References

Villages in Semily District